The Greens (––) are a green and regionalist political party (with eco-socialist and self-proclaimed social-democratic tendencies) active in South Tyrol, northern Italy. Once the provincial section of the Federation of the Greens, the party is now autonomous and often forms different alliances at the country-level (most recently with Left Ecology Freedom, Italian Left and Free and Equal, while the Italian Greens have sided with Civil Revolution and the Democratic Party), but both joined Green Europe, a coalition of green parties for the 2019 European Parliament election.

The Greens are inter-ethnic and strive to improve relations between the three language groups of the Province: Italian-, German- and Ladin-speakers. Since 2019 the party's spokespersons have been Felix Wohlgemuth and Marlene Pernstich.

History
The Greens have their roots in the New Left and the environmental movements of the 1970s. They started to compete in elections in 1978, but were formally registered as a party only in 1996. From 1978 to 1996 they used different names: New Left (1978), Alternative List (1983), Green Alternative List (1988) and finally Greens (since 1993). Alexander Langer, founder and early leader of the party, committed suicide in 1995.

Other than in the Landtag of South Tyrol since 1978, the party was successively represented in the European Parliament by long-time activist Langer (1989–1995), mountaineer Reinhold Messner (1999–2004) and theologian Sepp Kusstatscher (2004–2009).

In the 2003 provincial election the party obtained 7.9% of the vote and three provincial councillors: Cristina Kury, Kusstatscher (a former member of the South Tyrolean People's Party, SVP) and Hans Heiss. In the 2004 European Parliament election, the Greens won 13.1% of the vote in the Province, their best result ever, and sent Kusstatscher to the European Parliament, replacing Messner.

In the 2008 provincial election the Greens won only the 5.8% of the vote, losing votes (-2.1%) and one seat from 2003. The two elected Green councillors were Heiss and Riccardo Dello Sbarba, who succeeded to Kusstatscher.

In the 2013 general election the Greens did not follow the national party into the Civil Revolution alliance and decided instead to support Left Ecology Freedom (SEL), whose regional slate included Green Florian Kronbichler, who was the first German-speaker to be elected not for the SVP.

In the 2013 provincial election the Greens won 8.7% of the vote (+2.9%), their record high in a provincial election, and sent three elects to the Provincial Council: Heiss, Dello Sbarba and Brigitte Foppa. In the 2014 European Parliament election the Greens supported The Other Europe, an electoral alliance launched by Italian Left (SI, successor of SEL) and other left-wing parties, but its candidate Oktavia Brugger was not elected. In the 2015 municipal election in Merano, the second-largest South Tyrolean city, Green Paul Rösch was elected mayor with 60.7% of the vote in the run-off: it was the first time that the Greens were to win a large municipality.

In the 2018 general election Kronbichler did not stand again and the Greens continued to join forces with SI within the Free and Equal electoral list, with Norbert Lantschner as its standard-bearer. Lantschner was not elected and the Greens lost their representation in Parliament.

In the 2018 provincial election the Greens won 6.8% of the vote (-1.9pp) and again sent three elected to the Provincial Council. In the 2019 European Parliament election the Greens joined the Green Europe (EV) electoral list, with Norbert Lantschner as their candidate, and obtained 8.7% of the vote. In November 2019 the party became a full member of the European Green Party.

In July 2022, at a convention in Rome, spokesperson Marlene Pernstich participated in the launch event of New Energies, a joint list for the next Italian general election formed by EV and SI.

Popular support
The Greens' best result in a provincial election was in 2013, when the party won 8.7% of the vote. In that occasion, the Greens obtained their highest shares in five small municipalities: Urtijëi (13.9%), Bronzolo (13.7%), Montan (12.8%), Auer (12.4%) and Glurns (11.7%). Despite this, the party was usually stronger in cities than in rural areas: it did well in the three largest cities (11.4% in Bolzano, 10.6% in Merano and 11.0% in Brixen), while it did worse in the four most rural districts – Vinschgau (7.3%, despite Glurns), Salten-Schlern (7.2%, despite Urtijëi), Pustertal (6.9%, despite 11.6% in Bruneck) and Wipptal (6.5%) – and in Ladin municipalities (5.9%, despite Urtijëi). Previous and subsequent elections showed similar patterns of the vote.

The electoral results of the Greens in South Tyrol since 1992 are shown in the table below.

Provincial Council

Leadership

Spokesperson: Carlo Bertorelle (1996–1998), Leander Moroder (1998–2006), Franco Bernard (2006–2009), Sepp Kusstatscher and Brigitte Foppa (2009–2013), Giorgio Zanvettor and Brigitte Foppa (2014–2016), Hans Heiss and Brigitte Foppa (2016–2017), Tobias Planer and Brigitte Foppa (2017–2019), Felix Wohlgemuth and Marlene Pernstich (2019–present)

References

Sources
Provincial Council of Bolzano – Historical Archive
Trentino Alto-Adige Region – Elections
Provincial Government of Bolzano – Elections
Cattaneo Institute – Archive of Election Data
South Tyrol/Italy—Parties and Elections in Europe
Ministry of the Interior – Historical Archive of Elections
Günther Pallaver, Political parties in Alto Adige from 1945 to 2005
Hermann Atz, Die Grünen Südtirols. Profil und Wählerbasis, StudienVerlag, Innsbruck/Vienna/Bolzano 2007, .
Joachim Gatterer, "rote milben im gefieder". Sozialdemokratische, kommunistische und grün-alternative Parteipolitik in Südtirol, StudienVerlag, Innsbruck/Vienna/Bolzano 2009,

External links
Official website

1996 establishments in Italy
Green political parties in Italy
Left-wing politics in Italy
Political parties established in 1996
Political parties in South Tyrol
Social democratic parties in Italy
Federation of the Greens